Robert Gesink (born 31 May 1986) is a Dutch professional cyclist, who currently rides for UCI WorldTeam . His major victories include the 2012 Tour of California, the 2011 Tour of Oman and the 2010 Grand Prix Cycliste de Montréal. Gesink also won the Giro dell'Emilia twice and offered some good performances on Grand Tours and one-week stage races, thanks in part to his climbing and time trialing abilities.

Career

Early years
Gesink was born in Varsseveld. At the Junior World Championships of 2004 UCI Road World Championships in Verona, Gesink finished eighth in the individual time trial and sixth in the road race, while riding for team De Peddelaars in Aalten. After this rather successful WC he went to team Lowik-Van Losser for one year. He joined the  Continental team in 2006. He finished third overall in Volta ao Algarve and won the overall classification and the third stage of Settimana Ciclistica Lombarda. He later won a stage and the overall classification of the Circuito Montañés and finished second in the prestigious Tour de l'Avenir. Gesink initially signed a two-year deal with Rabobank Continental but team manager Theo de Rooij decided to move him to the  team for the 2007 season.

2007
In his first year as professional cyclist, Gesink won the young riders jersey in the Tour of California. He finished 9th in his first UCI ProTour race ever, in La Flèche Wallonne. After riding another top 15 in the Tour de Romandie won by his teammate Thomas Dekker, he won his first race as professional at the queen stage in the Tour of Belgium riding away from everyone on Côte de La Redoute. The next year, he finished just outside the top ten in the Clásica de San Sebastián, fifth in the Deutschland Tour, and second in the Tour de Pologne. He subsequently got selected for the UCI Road World Championships in Stuttgart. In the Giro di Lombardia he finished fifteenth.

2008
In his 2nd year as professional, in 2008, he showed progression by winning the hardest stage in the Tour of California, where Gesink rode away on the final climb, with only Levi Leipheimer holding his wheel. They stayed ahead on the final 35 kilometers of downhill and flat and Leipheimer did not contest Gesink in the sprint. Gesink won the young riders jersey again and finished 9th in the general classification. In the Paris–Nice he finished second in the stage up to Mont Serein, five kilometers before the top of Mont Ventoux, where he was outsprinted by Cadel Evans. He then lost the leader's jersey in the penultimate stage to Cannes, when he got isolated on the Col du Tanneron which, together with Gesink's overly careful descent, allowed Davide Rebellin to take the leader's jersey. He finished fourth in the overall classification, 51 seconds behind Rebellin, which won Gesink the youth classification. He also finished twelfth in the Tour of the Basque Country and completed a successful Ardennes classics by finishing fourth in La Flèche Wallonne. In September, he then finished seventh in his first Grand Tour, the Vuelta a España.

2009

In 2009, Gesink finished fourth overall in the Critérium du Dauphiné Libéré. He started his first Tour de France but broke his wrist during a crash on stage 5. He completed the stage, but had to withdraw from the Tour due to his injuries. He recovered in time to enter into the Vuelta a España. He finished the Vuelta a España in 6th place; he was in 2nd place, but due to a fall where he sustained deep cuts in his knee, he was too injured to keep up in the final mountain stage. Afterwards Gesink focused on regaining his form for the World Championships in Mendrisio, but he had not recovered fast enough and finished off the pace. However, a week later he was back to his old self and took the victory in the Giro dell'Emilia, beating Jakob Fuglsang and Thomas Löfkvist to the line in an uphill sprint. He also took 6th place in the Giro di Lombardia and finished the season as 10th on the UCI World Ranking.

2010
Gesink's schedule for 2010 was about the same as that of 2009, only this time he did manage to get a good result in the Tirreno–Adriatico (fifth). Due to the absence of, among others, Alberto Contador and Cadel Evans, he started as one of the favorites for the Tour of the Basque Country. He impressed during the most important stage, was in the top 3 and even had a chance at winning the tour, when in stage 5 he fell once again. Eventually he finished 9th and seemed to have the form he needed for the Classics. In the Amstel Gold Race, La Flèche Wallonne and Liège–Bastogne–Liège he had disappointing races and could not compete for the victories. After that he went to altitude training in the Sierra Nevada mountains. He did not compete in any events for a while, while focusing on the Tour de France. His form showed during the Tour de Suisse, where he was victorious in the most difficult stage. With this win he took over the leader's jersey from Tony Martin. In the closing time trial he had a bad day and lost his leading position to Fränk Schleck, and finally finished fifth.

He participated in the Tour de France for the second time and completed it for the first time in 6th place in the general classification, the highest finishing position for a Dutch rider in over a decade, and 2nd in the young rider classification. After Contador and Denis Menchov were disqualified because of doping issues, Gesink formally ended 4th. He also wore the white jersey as leader of the young rider classification from stages 10 to 15. After the Tour, Gesink won the Giro dell'Emilia for the second straight year. In October, Gesink had to mourn his father, who died as the result of a cycling accident.

2011
The start of Gesink's 2011 season was productive, with two stage wins in the Tour of Oman (one uphill finish and one individual time trial in which he beat World Champion Fabian Cancellara), and winning the overall classification and the youth classification. He took the race lead after the 4th stage of the Tirreno–Adriatico, but lost it a day later to Cadel Evans. In the closing time trial, Gesink climbed in the general classification from fifth to second overall. He continued to show his good form in the Tour of the Basque Country where he finished third overall. He did not continue this good form in the Ardennes classics and a ninth place at the Amstel Gold Race was his best performance in the three races dominated by Philippe Gilbert. In September he suffered a crash in training where he broke his leg in four places, and had a surgical operation which left screws and pins in his body.

2012
After an unproductive start to the season, Gesink found his form in the Tour of California. He finished third in the stage 5 time trial and enjoyed a prestigious victory on the slopes of Mount Baldy in stage 7 of the race, where he attacked  from the finish to take the leader's jersey and the mountaintop stage win. His leading position was never seriously tested in the short final stage, and he won his first tour since the 2011 Tour of Oman. For the Tour de France, he was considered one of the Dutch hopefuls who might finish in the top ten, but he fell in the massive crash that occurred on the sixth stage, damaging his ribs. After battling through the pain, he abandoned on stage 11. He then went on to participate in the Vuelta a España, and he made an impact by finishing in sixth position overall behind the winner Alberto Contador. Gesink was always competitive in the mountains, which allowed him to retain such a high placing.

2013 
Gesink had an uneventful 2013 season. He aimed to win the Giro d'Italia though he abandoned in the second week. His only victory was the Grand Prix Cycliste de Québec in September.

2014 
Gesink had a promising start to his 2014 season finishing 6th in the Tour Down Under and 5th in the Tour of Oman. His season however was disrupted by heart problems for which he received surgery, preventing him from riding the Tour de France, switching his hopes to the Vuelta a España. However, while he was in seventh position overall at the Vuelta, he withdrew before Stage 18 to be with his pregnant wife who was hospitalized.

2015

After racing the Volta ao Algarve, Gesink suffered a knee injury. He came back at La Fleche Wallonne with a 25th placing. He then raced the Tour de Romandie and finished 15th overall. Then he focused on the Tour de France, riding in the Tour de Suisse in preparation for the Grand Tour and finished in a solid 9th place. He did even better in France, where he finished 6th, right behind big names like Contador and Nibali.

2016
The main goal for the 2016 season was the Tour de France however Gesink crashed at the Tour de Suisse, and had no chance to recover in time for the Tour de France. He rode the Vuelta a España instead, and won Stage 14 to Col d'Aubisque. He also finished on the podium several times during that Vuelta. Gesink rode the Il Lombardia and finished 7th.

2017
For the 2017 season, Gesink's main goal was to win a stage at the Tour de France, and he came very close on stage 8 where he finished 2nd just behind Lilian Calmejane. Unfortunately Gesink abandoned the Tour on the following stage after a crash. He only returned to outdoor training at the start of October due to injuries.

2018
Gesink continued to work hard during the winter meaning he did not have an off-season like other professional riders. His goal was to get ready for the Tour Down Under which he eventually did and finished 10th overall. One week after the Tour Down Under, he rode the Cadel Evans Great Ocean Road Race and finished 11th as he did in 2017. Gesink had ambitions of winning a stage in the Giro d'Italia, and worked as a domestique to George Bennett for most of the race before eventually getting his chance on stage 20 where he finished 2nd behind Mikel Nieve. Gesink started the Tour de France, and worked for most of stage 1 in the front to close in the gap from the breakaway so that Dylan Groenewegen would have a chance to sprint for the yellow jersey, however Groenewegen only finished 6th in that sprint.

Major results

2004
 1st  Time trial, National Junior Road Championships
 UCI Junior Road World Championships
6th Road race
8th Time trial
 8th Overall Course de la Paix Juniors
2005
 6th Overall Giro delle Regioni
 8th Rund um Düren
2006
 1st  Overall Circuito Montañés
1st Stage 6
 1st  Overall Settimana Ciclistica Lombarda
1st Stage 3
 2nd Overall Tour de l'Avenir
 3rd Overall Volta ao Algarve
 4th Rund um Köln
 6th Road race, UCI Under-23 Road World Championships
 6th Overall Tour de la Somme
 7th Ronde van Vlaanderen Beloften
2007
 1st  Young rider classification, Tour of California
 1st Stage 4 Tour of Belgium
 2nd Overall Tour de Pologne
 5th Overall Deutschland Tour
1st  Young rider classification
 5th Profronde van Fryslan
 9th La Flèche Wallonne
 9th Clásica de Almería
 10th Giro dell'Emilia
 10th Hel van het Mergelland
2008
 4th Overall Paris–Nice
1st  Young rider classification
 4th Overall Critérium du Dauphiné Libéré
 4th La Flèche Wallonne
 7th Overall Vuelta a España
 9th Overall Tour of California
1st  Young rider classification
1st Stage 3
 9th Giro dell'Emilia
 10th Road race, UCI Road World Championships
 Olympic Games
10th Road race
10th Time trial
2009
 1st Giro dell'Emilia
 3rd Amstel Gold Race
 4th Overall Critérium du Dauphiné Libéré
 6th Overall Vuelta a España
 6th Giro di Lombardia
 7th Overall Tour of the Basque Country
 8th Overall Tour of California
1st  Young rider classification
 10th UCI World Ranking
2010
 1st Grand Prix Cycliste de Montréal
 1st Giro dell'Emilia
 3rd Grand Prix Cycliste de Québec
 4th Overall Tour de France
 5th Overall Tirreno–Adriatico
1st  Young rider classification
 5th Overall Tour de Suisse
1st Stage 6
 6th UCI World Ranking
 7th Clásica de San Sebastián
 8th Overall Tour of the Basque Country
 8th Overall Tour Méditerranéen
2011
 1st  Overall Tour of Oman
1st  Young rider classification
1st Stages 4 & 5 (ITT)
 2nd Overall Tirreno–Adriatico
1st  Young rider classification
1st Stage 1 (TTT)
 2nd Grand Prix Cycliste de Québec
 3rd Overall Tour of the Basque Country
 9th Amstel Gold Race
 Tour de France
Held  after Stage 7
2012
 1st  Overall Tour of California
1st Stage 7
 4th Overall Tour de Suisse
 6th Overall Vuelta a España
 6th Overall Vuelta a Burgos
 8th Overall Vuelta a Murcia
2013
 1st Grand Prix Cycliste de Québec
 3rd Trofeo Serra de Tramuntana
 4th Vuelta a Murcia
 5th Overall Tour of Alberta
 6th Overall Volta a Catalunya
 8th Overall Tour of Beijing
 9th Overall Tour de Luxembourg
 10th Giro di Lombardia
2014
 5th Overall Tour of Oman
 6th Overall Tour Down Under
 8th Overall Tour de Pologne
2015
 5th Overall Tour of California
 6th Overall Tour de France
 8th Grand Prix Cycliste de Montréal
 9th Overall Tour de Suisse
2016
 1st Stage 14 Vuelta a España
 7th Giro di Lombardia
2017
 3rd Time trial, National Road Championships
 8th Overall Tour Down Under
2018
 7th Japan Cup
 8th Clásica de San Sebastián
 10th Overall Tour Down Under
2019
 8th Japan Cup
2022
 Vuelta a España
1st Stage 1 (TTT)
Held  after Stage 1
 Combativity award Stage 18

General classification results timeline
Sources:

Classics results timeline

See also
 List of Dutch Olympic cyclists

References

External links

Profile at Belkin Pro Cycling official website

Palmares at Cycling Base (French)

1986 births
Living people
People from Oude IJsselstreek
Dutch male cyclists
Cyclists at the 2008 Summer Olympics
Cyclists at the 2012 Summer Olympics
Olympic cyclists of the Netherlands
Tour de Suisse stage winners
Dutch Vuelta a España stage winners
UCI Road World Championships cyclists for the Netherlands
Cyclists from Gelderland
21st-century Dutch people